R16 Korea is an annual international b-boy tournament and urban arts cultural festival sponsored primarily by the Korea Tourism Organization and the South Korean Ministry of Culture, Sports and Tourism. The main event features sixteen B-Boy crews representing fifteen countries competing in a two-day tournament for world championship titles in two categories: best crew performance and best crew battle. The B-Boy tournament is notable for employing its own unique judging system that uses criteria and scoring to decide a winner, and to provide a transparent and fair competition.

The festival features graffiti artists, street wear designers, musical performers and dancers who specialize in hip-hop, popping, locking and other urban arts subcultures from South Korea and other countries.

History 
Created and Organized by Korea Tourism Organization produced by Cartel Creative Inc., R16 is a celebration of the creative energy behind urban youth culture. Based on a theme of "Respect" (which is what the "R" in R16 refers to), the tournament and festivals were first held in 2007 in the city of Seoul.

The 2008 event took place in the city of Suwon The 2009 event host is the Metropolitan City of Incheon and the 2010 event was brought back to Seoul City. The event will continue annually, as the Hip Hop culture has recognized South Korean b-boys as a special part of its history. Korean-American b-boy, singer, and rapper, Jay Park, has been the official ambassador of R16 from 2011 until 2013. Since 2014, R-16 Korea partnered up with the World BBoy Series and helped create Undisputed, an event to crown the solo world b-boy champion.

In 2016, the funding from the Korean government was cancelled and the competition was not held in 2017 and 2018.

Winners

2019
In 2019 edition, Korean-sport brand FILA bought the naming rights for the competition, and the competition has therefore been named the 2019 FILA Respect Culture for sponsorship reasons.

2019 Crew Battle Results
Location: Taipei, Taiwan

Date: September 14, 2019

Judges:
 Viruz (TIP)
 Crazy Legs (Rock Steady Crew)
 Mouse (Mighty Zulu Kingz/Floorgangz)
 Eagle1 (Hoody Homies/Artistreet)
 Raigo (Ariya/MB Crew/Mighty Zulu Kingz)

Individuals in bold won their respective battles.

2019 Solo B-Boy Battle Results

Location: Taipei, Taiwan

Date: September 14, 2019

Judges:
 Viruz (TIP)
 Crazy Legs (Rock Steady Crew)
 Mouse (Mighty Zulu Kingz/Floorgangz)
 Eagle1 (Hoody Homies/Artistreet)
 Raigo (Ariya/MB Crew/Mighty Zulu Kingz)

Individuals in bold won their respective battles.

2016
In 2016, R16 changed the name to be Respect Culture due to particular things toward Korean government funding. Instead of held in South Korea as usual, Respect Culture will be held in Taipei, Taiwan along with Challenge Cup.

2016 Crew Battle Results
Location: Taipei, Taiwan

Date: December 11, 2016

Judges:
 The End (Gamblerz)
 Wing Zero (Foundnation)
 Crazy Legs (Rock Steady Crew)
 Bojin (Bboy World Asia)
 Wing (Jinjo , 7 Commandoz, Red Bull BC One All-Stars)

Individuals in bold won their respective battles.

2016 Solo B-Boy Battle Results

Location: Taipei, Taiwan

Date: December 11, 2016

Judges:
 The End (Gamblerz)
 Danny (Caster Crew, Mighty Zulu Kingz)
 Crazy Legs (Rock Steady Crew)
 Chen Chen (HRC)
 Wing (Jinjo, 7 Commandoz, Red Bull BC One All-Stars)

Individuals in bold won their respective battles.

2015

2015 Crew Battle results
In 2015, R16 changed its format for their crew battles. Each country will now have the best possible team to represent the entire nation. Two wildcard members will join the one-on-one b-boy winner and the 4-member crew winner to form a 7-member national team to represent their country at the World Finals.  
R16 was held in Seoul, South Korea on September 12–13 at Junggu Jangchung Gymnasium.

Individuals in bold won their respective battles.

2015 Solo B-Boy Battle Results

Location: Seoul, Korea

Date: September 12, 2015

Judges:
Bootuz (Predatorz Crew / Russia) 
Ducky (Drifterz / South Korea)
Flo Master (Footwork Fanatix, 7 Gems / USA)
Katsu (Flooriorz, MZK / Japan)
Kujo (Soul Control, ILL-Abilities Crew / USA)

Individuals in bold won their respective battles.

Menno earned the fourth bid to the Undisputed World BBoy Series at the end of the 2015 year by winning R16 Korea.

2014

2014 Crew Battle Results
For 2014, R16 Seoul, South Korea on July 6–7 at Olympic Hall, Seoul Olympic Park.

Individuals in bold won their respective battles.

2014 Solo B-Boy Battle Results
Issei earned the second bid to the Undisputed at the end of the 2014 year by winning R16 Korea.

Location: Seoul, Korea

Date: July 6, 2014

Judges:
Lil G (Speedy Angels Family / Venezuela) 
Benji (France)
Differ (T.I.P., 7 Commandoz / South Korea)
Storm (Battle Squad / Germany)
Asia One (USA)

Individuals in bold won their respective battles.

Issei earned the second bid to the Undisputed World BBoy Series at the end of the 2014 year by winning R16 Korea.

2013

For 2013, R16 Seoul, South Korea on July 13–14 at Olympic Hall, Seoul Olympic Park.

2013 Main Event Competition Results
Crew Performance Competition Results:
 Best Show: Body Carnival (Japan)

Crew Battle Results:
 First Place: Morning of Owl (Korea)
 Second Place: Body Carnival (Japan)

Solo Bboy Battle Results:
 First Place:Issei (Japan)
 Second Place:Blond (Australia)

2013 Crew Battle Results

Crews in bold won their respective battles.

2013 Solo B-Boy Battle Results
Location: Seoul, Korea

Individuals in bold won their respective battles.

2012

2012 Crew Battle Results
For 2012, R16 Seoul, South Korea at Olympic Hall, Seoul Olympic Park.

Crews in bold won their respective battles.

2012 Solo B-Boy Battle Results
Bboys in bold won their respective battles.

2011
For 2011, R16 Seoul, South Korea on July 2–03 at Olympic Hall, Seoul Olympic Park.

MCs:
Jazzy Ivy (Korea)
MC Go (Korea)

DJs:
 DJ Skeme Richards (USA)
DJ Batsu (Japan)
DJ Light (Japan)
DJ Wreckx (Korea)

Judges:
Ken Swift (USA)
Alieness (USA)
Roxrite (USA)
Focus (Finland)
Physicx (Korea)
Popin Pete (USA) FunkStyle
Tony GoGo (USA) FunkStyle
Bruce(France) FunkStyle
P-Lock (France) FunkStyle
Woong (Korea) FunkStyle
Crazy Kyo (Korea) FunkStyle

2011 Main Event Competition Results
Crew Performance Competition Results:
Best Show: Jinjo Crew (Korea)

Crew Battle Results:
First Place: Jinjo Crew (Korea)
Second Place: Vagabonds (France)

Solo Bboy Battle Results:
First Place:Taisuke (Japan)
Second Place:Lil G (Venezuela)

2011 Main Event Competitor List
Crew
Vagabonds: France
Top 9: Russia
STO Crew: China
Formosa Crew: Taiwan
Simple System: Kazakhstan
Killafornia: USA
All Area Crew: Japan
South Korea: Jinjo Crew

Solo Bboys
Trickx: Korea
Pocket: Korea
Mounir: France
Lil G: Venezuela
Lil Amok: Germany
 C-Lil: Laos
 Thesis: USA
 Taisuke: Japan

Showcase & Performing Artists
Drunken Tiger: Korea
Jay Park: Korea
Art of Movement: USA
Sunzoo: USA
Red Bull All Stars: World Wide

2010
For 2010, R16 was brought back to Seoul, South Korea on July 3–04 at Olympic Hall, Seoul Olympic Park.

MCs:
Jazzy Ivy (Korea)
MC Go (Korea)
Dumbfoundead (USA)

DJs:
 DJ Timber (Ireland)
DJ Ben (France)
DJ Light (Japan)
DJ Wreckx (Korea)

Judges:
Easy Rock (USA)
Flo Master (USA)
Kwikstep (USA)
Brahim (France)
Hong 10 (Korea)
Legend (USA) FunkStyle
Walid (France) FunkStyle
Junior (France) FunkStyle
Khan (Korea) FunkStyle
Zero (Korea) FunkStyle

2010 Main Event Competition Results
Crew Performance Competition Results:
Best Show: Jinjo Crew (Korea)

Crew Battle Results:
First Place: Jinjo Crew (Korea)
Second Place: Phase T (France)

Solo Bboy Battle Results:
First Place: Niek (The Netherlands)
Second Place:Neguin (Brazil)

2010 Main Event Competitor List
Crew
Phase T: France
Terror Bunch: Germany
Caster Revolution: China
Big Toe Crew: Vietnam
Project P-Noise: Philippines
Puerto Rican All Stars: Puerto Rico
Fusion Rockers: Spain
Jinjo Crew: South Korea

Solo Bboys
Neguin: Brazil
Wing: Korea
Lil Kev: France
Lil G: Venezuela
El Nino: Dominican Republic
Just Do It: The Netherlands
Palmer: USA
Linh 3T: Vietnam

2009
For 2009, R16 was held in Metropolitan City of Incheon, South Korea on Sept 25 ~ 27 at Main Stage.

MCs:
Jazzy Ivy
Make One

DJs:
 DJ Skeme Richards (USA)
DJ Renegade (UK)
DJ Light (Japan)
DJ Wreckx (Korea)
DJ Tee (Japan)

Judges:
Ken Swift (USA)
YNOT (USA)
Storm (Germany)
Lilou (France)
Ducky (Korea)

2009 Main Event Competition Results
Crew Performance Competition Results:
Best Show: All Area Crew (Japan)

Crew Battle Results:
First Place: All Area Crew (Japan)
Second Place: Top 9 Crew (Russia)

2009 Main Event Competitor List
Canada: Super Naturalz Crew
China: STO Crew
Finland: Sticky Ruckus Crew
France: Silent Trix Crew
Poland: Polskee Flavour Crew
Netherlands: Hustle Kidz
Portugal: Momentum Crew
Spain: Arcopom Crew
Japan: All Area Crew
Ukraine: East Side Bboyz
Singapore: Radikal Forze
Russia: Top 9 Crew
Taiwan: Formosa
USA: Renegade Rockers
South Korea: Rivers Crew
South Korea: Gamblerz Crew

2008
For 2008, R16 was held in Suwon City, South Korea on May 31 and June 1 at Suwon Olympic Hall.

MCs:
Jazzy Ivy
Ivan

DJs:
DJ Renegade
DJ Light
DJ Wreckx
DJ Jus Jones
DJ Cut Nice

Judges:
Ken Swift
Cros One
Storm
Maurizio
Katsu

2008 Main Event Competition Results
Crew Performance Competition Results:
First Place: Top 9 Crew (Russia)
Second Place: Gamblerz Crew (South Korea)

Crew Battle Results:
First Place: Gamblerz Crew (South Korea)
Second Place: Top 9 Crew (Russia)
Third Place: Brazil All-Star Crew (Brazil)
Fourth Place: Rivers Crew (South Korea)

2008 Main Event Competitor List
Belgium: Hoochen Crew
Brazil: Brazil All-Star Crew
Denmark: Natural Effects Crew
France: Pockemon Crew
Germany: Funk Fellaz Crew
Netherlands: Funky Dope Manouvres
Israel: Unstoppable Lions
Italy: Rapid Soul Moves
Japan: Turn Phrase Crew
China: Pioneer Crew
Norway: Ghost Crew
Russia: Top 9 Crew
Republic of South Africa: Immortal Style
USA: Super Crew
South Korea: Rivers Crew
South Korea: Gamblerz Crew

2007
The 2007 was held in downtown Seoul, South Korea on June 1 and 2 at the Jamsil Olympic Stadium.

MCs:
Jazzy Ivy
Ivan

DJs:
DJ Element
DJ Renegade
DJ Wreckx
DJ Light
DJ Jinmoo
DJ Dust
DJ Jun

Judges:
Ken Swift
Lil'Caesar
Poe One
Crazy
Swift Rock

2007 Main Event Competition Results
Crew Performance Competition Results:
First Place: Mortal Combat (Japan)
Second Place: Drifterz Crew (South Korea)
Cyon Award: Tsunami All Stars (Brazil)

Crew Battle Results:
First Place: Rivers Crew (South Korea)
Second Place: Flow Mo Crew (Finland)
Third Place: Massive Monkees (USA)
Fourth Place: Tsunami All Stars (Brazil)
Fresh Award: Style Crax (Germany)

2007 Main Event Competitor List
Addstars
Flow Mo Crew
Ground Scatter
Sto Crew
Style Crax
Formosa
Knuckle Head Zoo
Massive Monkees
Mortal Combat
No Half Stepping
Figure 2 Style
Soul Mavericks
Tsunami All Stars
Super Naturalz
Drifterz Crew
Rivers Crew

References

External links
Official site
2011 Teaser 

Breakdance
Street dance competitions